The Pāygān-sālār were commanders of the infantry units (paygan) within the Sassanid armies. The Paygan-salar were very respected and trustworthy men, they would be guarded by the elite Dailamites.

The Paygān-Sālārs may have also acted as warden of prisons.

Sources 

Sassanian Elite Cavalry AD 224-642
History Magazine
Historiae
 Peter Wilcox, Rome's Enemies 3: Parthians and Sassanid Persians (Osprey Publishing 2001). .
 David Nicolle, Sassanian Armies: the Iranian empire early 3rd to mid-7th centuries AD (Montvert Publishing 1996). .

Sasanian military offices
Persian words and phrases